Windhoek International School (known locally as the International School or WIS) is an independent, co-educational, international school located in Windhoek, Namibia. The school provides education from Early Years 1 through to Grade 12. It offers the IB Primary Years Programme and IB Diploma Programme as well as the International General Certificate of Secondary Education. As an IB World School it is the only school in Namibia to offer International Baccalaureate programmes and is the one of the first schools worldwide to be authorised to offer these programmes. The school also boasts an international community of students from 45 different countries. Unlike other schools in Namibia, the International School's school year runs from mid-August to mid-June.

History 
The Windhoek International School was founded by the Nielsen family in 1990, the same year Namibia achieved independence. The family were working for the United Nations in Windhoek and wanted to establish a school whose ethos was openness, free expression, democratic values and international understanding. At its inception the school had no campus and shared campuses with other schools. The School moved into purpose-built facilities in 1994.

Campus 

The Windhoek International School campus is exceptionally large compared to other schools in Windhoek. The unique shape and layout of the structures were designed to resemble that of an African Village. The classrooms, labs and other buildings are arranged in clusters of green-roofed hexagonal buildings. These clusters are distributed over a wide area and connected by bricked paths covered mostly by corrugated iron shading.

The campus includes on-site sports facilities including a football pitch and a smaller grass field which is used for volleyball and other sports, a PE hall with an indoor basketball court and athletics and gymnastics equipment, an outdoor half court for streetball and a tennis court which also serves as an outdoor basketball court. It has a library, an IT lab with more than 20 computers and science labs with advanced scientific equipment for students studying experimental sciences at IGCSE or IB level. The school administration building is located in the centre of the campus and a large parking area has been built on the grounds.

The school hosts the Diogo Cão Portuguese Language Centre which contains the classrooms for foreign language subjects, a media centre and an auditorium for the whole school. The Language Centre also provides Portuguese language classes and other activities after school hours.

Curriculum 
The Windhoek International School is an IB World School and is the only school in Namibia to offer International Baccalaureate programmes. In contrast with other Namibian schools which offer the Namibian Senior Secondary Certificate, the International School offers a variety of International Curricula that it believes better suit its international community of students. The school offers different curricula for different year groups, as shown in the table below:

The Middle School Programme in Grade 6 - 8 transition students from primary school to secondary school and prepare them for the International General Certificate of Secondary Education.

See also 
 Education in Namibia
 List of schools in Namibia

References

External links
 

Schools in Windhoek
International Baccalaureate schools
Private schools in Namibia
Educational institutions established in 1990
International schools in Namibia
1990 establishments in Namibia